Ceramium virgatum, or the red hornweed, is a small red marine alga.

Description
This small alga grows erect with cylindrical filamentous axes. It is repeatedly branched, corticate and grow to 30 cm long. Very difficult to identify from some other species.

Habitat
Common in rock pools and in the upper sub-littoral in a wide range of habitats.

Distribution
Widely distributed around the British Isles including the Isle of Man and the Shetland Islands.

Nomenclature
The non-spiny species of Ceramium are in taxonomic chaos and there is confusion concerning this species which is referred to as Ceramium nodulosum in some references.

References

virgatum